Tapso is a municipality and village in Santiago del Estero in Argentina.  It adjoins the village and municipality of Tapso in Catamarca.

References

Populated places in Santiago del Estero Province